Grassick is a surname. Notable people with the surname include:

Chris Grassick (born 1990), Scottish field hockey player
James Grassick (1868–1956), Canadian businessman and politician